One Breath is a 2015 German drama film directed by Christian Zübert. It was screened in the Contemporary World Cinema section of the 2015 Toronto International Film Festival to positive reviews.

Cast
 Jördis Triebel as Tessa
 Chara Mata Giannatou as Elena
 Benjamin Sadler as Jan
 Apostolis Totsikas as Costas
 Nike Maria Vassil as Sofia
 Pinelopi Sergounioti as Despina
 Mary Nanou as Maria
 Akilas Karazisis as Tiberios Laskari

References

External links
 

2015 films
2015 drama films
German drama films
2010s German-language films
Films set in Frankfurt
Films set in Athens
Films about missing people
2010s German films